Hazel Park High School is a public high school in Hazel Park, Michigan. The school serves grades 9-12 and is a part of the Hazel Park Schools District.  It opened in 1929 at the current site of the Junior High School and moved to its current location in 1961.  The school has been named a Reward School by the Michigan Department of Education.

Notable alumni
 Bob Welch, Major League Baseball (MLB) Pitcher for the Los Angeles Dodgers (1978–87) and Oakland Athletics (1988–94). 1990 AL CY Young Award Winner.
 Danny Smick (1915–1975), professional basketball and minor league baseball player
 Frank Anthony Polito, author and playwright
 Steve Fraser, American Olympic Gold Medalist athlete wrestler and coach.
 Joe Roa, former Major League Baseball right-handed pitcher.
 Myles Jury,  American mixed martial artist.

References

Hazel Park High School website
Great schools entry on Hazel Park High School

Public high schools in Michigan
High schools in Oakland County, Michigan
1929 establishments in Michigan
Educational institutions established in 1929